The 2018 American Cup was part of the World Cup circuit in artistic gymnastics.

Participants

Results

Women

Men

Nastia Liukin Cup 

The 9th annual Nastia Liukin Cup was held in conjunction with the 2018 American Cup. Since its inception in 2010, the competition has always been held on the Friday night before the American Cup, in the same arena.

Medal winners

Notable competitors 
Senior winner Haleigh Bryant would go on to win the 2020 Nastia Liukin Cup.  Additionally she was the 2021 NCAA champion on vault.  Senior competitor Natalie Wojcik would go on to win the balance beam title at the 2019 NCAA Championships.  Junior bronze medalist Faith Torrez, alongside fellow juniors Olivia Greaves and Kailin Chio, would go on to make the USA national team.

References 

American Cup (gymnastics)
American Cup
American Cup
American Cup